Balthasar van der Pol (27 January 1889 – 6 October 1959) was a Dutch physicist.

Life and work 
Van der Pol began his studies of physics in Utrecht in 1911. J. A. Fleming offered van der Pol the use of the Pender Electrical Laboratory at University College for a study of the heuristics of wireless reception on board ships. In England he also worked with J. J. Thomson. Upon his return to the Netherlands, Balthsar worked with Hendrik Lorentz at Teylers Stichting. For his thesis he wrote The effect of an ionised gas on electro-magnetic wave propagation and its application to radio, as demonstrated by glow-discharge measurement under the supervision of Willem Henri Julius. He was awarded his Ph.D. in 1920. He joined Philips Research Laboratories in 1921, where he worked until his retirement in 1949.

As observed by Hendrik Casimir, "Radio might have remained a field of haphazard empiricism along with wild commercial ventures, but for the influence of men like Van der Pol who stressed the need for a more scientific approach."

The differential equations of coupled electrical systems drew his interest, and he developed the idea of "relaxation oscillations". With J. van der Mark he applied the idea to the heartbeat, which provided one of the earliest quantitative models of the action potential. These studies led him to the van der Pol equation and Oliver Heaviside’s operational calculus for dealing with differential equations. He submitted articles to Philosophical Magazine on the operational calculus and, in coordination with H. Bremmer, wrote Modern Operational Calculus based on the Two-sided Laplace Integral, published by Cambridge University Press.

He was awarded the Institute of Radio Engineers (now the IEEE) Medal of Honor in 1935. The asteroid 10443 van der Pol was named after him.

Van der Pol became member of the Royal Netherlands Academy of Arts and Sciences in 1949.

Works
 1928: (with J van der Mark) The Heartbeat considered as a Relaxation oscillation, and an Electrical Model of the Heart. Phil. Mag. Suppl. No. 6 pp 763–775
 1947: An electro-mechanical investigation of the Riemann zeta function in the critical strip, Bulletin of the American Mathematical Society 53: 976–81 
 1964: (with H. Bremmer) Operational Calculus Cambridge University Press
 1960: Selected Scientific Papers, North-Holland Two volumes

References

 December 1917: Balth van der Pol, Personalities in Wireless, Wireless World, page 592.
 H Bremmer (1960,1) The Scientific Work of Balthasar van der Pol, Philips Technical Review 22
 Dr. Balthsar van der Pol (1889-1959) from Philips archives
 Giorgio Israel (2004) "Technological Innovation and New Mathematics: van der Pol and the birth of non-linear dynamics", pages 52 to 77 in Technological Concepts and Mathematical Models in the Evolution of Modern Engineering Systems, edited by Ana Milian Gasca and others, Birkhäuser
 Balthasar Van der Pol at IEEE.org
 

1889 births
1959 deaths
20th-century Dutch physicists
IEEE Medal of Honor recipients
Scientists from Utrecht (city)
Academic staff of the Delft University of Technology
Utrecht University alumni
Members of the Royal Netherlands Academy of Arts and Sciences
20th-century Dutch inventors
Valdemar Poulsen Gold Medal recipients